Danie Venter (born 27 March 1979) is a South African professional boxer who fought from 2003 to 2016. As an amateur, he competed in the men's light heavyweight event at the 2000 Summer Olympics.

Professional boxing record

References

External links
 

1979 births
Living people
South African male boxers
Cruiserweight boxers
Heavyweight boxers
Olympic boxers of South Africa
Boxers at the 2000 Summer Olympics
Sportspeople from Pretoria
African Games medalists in boxing
African Games bronze medalists for South Africa
Competitors at the 1999 All-Africa Games
White South African people
Commonwealth Games medallists in boxing
Commonwealth Games bronze medallists for South Africa
Boxers at the 2002 Commonwealth Games
Medallists at the 2002 Commonwealth Games